Carl Brunner von Wattenwyl (13 June 1823, Bern – 24 August 1914, Kirchdorf) was a Swiss entomologist who specialised in Orthoptera, and a botanist.

Von Wattenwyl was a postmaster. He described many new taxa of Orthoptera.

His collection is conserved in the Naturhistorisches Museum in Vienna, the Naturhistorisches Museum der Burgergemeinde Bern (Natural History Museum of Bern), Bern, Staatliches Museum für Tierkunde Dresden, Senckenberg Museum in Frankfurt A.M. and Biozentrum Grindel und Zoologisches Museum, Hamburg.

Works
 With Leonardo Fea : Révision du système des orthoptères et description des espèces rapportées) Genova, Tip. del R. Istituto sordo-muti (1893)

References 
Anonym 1915 [Brunner von Wattenwyl, C.]  Ent. Rec. J. Var. 27
Bolivar, I. 1915 [Brunner von Wattenwyl, C.]  Bol. R. Soc. Esp. Hist. Nat. 15
Burr, M. 1900 [Brunner von Wattenwyl, C.]  Ent. Rec. J. Var. 12
Kaltenbach, A. P. 2003.  "Die Orthopterensammlung des Naturhistorischen Museums in Wien und ihre Geschichte". Denisia 8 57–61, 2 Photos
Nonveiller, G. 1999 The Pioneers of the research on the Insects of Dalmatia. Zagreb, *Hrvatski Pridodoslovni Muzej: 1-390
Rabaey, K. 2006 Biografie van Carl Brunner von Wattenwyl. Phasma 16(62) : 22-23

Reitter, E. 1914 [Brunner von Wattenwyl, C.]  Wien. ent. Ztg. 33

Footnotes

External links
 Internet Archive Download of Révision du système des orthoptères et description des espèces rapportées

1823 births
1914 deaths
19th-century Swiss botanists
Swiss entomologists
20th-century Swiss botanists
Swiss nobility
Scientists from Bern
Carl